Hihintayin Kita sa Langit is a 1991 award-winning Filipino romantic drama film directed by Carlos Siguion-Reyna based on a screenplay by Raquel Villavicencio, and starring Richard Gomez and Dawn Zulueta. The film is a loose adaptation of Emily Brontë's 1847 novel Wuthering Heights. The film was restored by ABS-CBN Film Restoration and Central Digital Lab and was subsequently released in select theaters on February 27, 2017.

Plot 
After the whole Salvador family mourned the loss of their eldest child Gabriel, Don Joaquin returns from Manila after going on some business trips, especially with a promise of giving souvenirs to his children. While Carmina is finding her gift, she discovers a dirty-looking boy in front of her eyes, attracting the attention of Milo and Yaya Adora. Apparently, the boy was an orphan and he was found by Don Joaquin in Divisoria but because of his good intentions for the orphan, he decided to adopt him and named him Gabriel after the deceased eldest child. Gabriel was accepted by the family except for Milo, who has hostility toward him. One afternoon, Gabriel and Carmina went to the shores' cliffs, playing together imagining the lives of royalty, similar to the tales of princes and princesses. Carmina becomes close with Gabriel, telling him that he is not an orphan, only an ordinary person. By the time they returned home, Milo shows up and starts blaming Gabriel for stealing his horse and attention to his father, leading the latter to be attacked and beaten by the former. Milo's unacceptable behavior towards his adoptive brother caused his father to banish him to live in Manila with his aunt instead until he changed his intentions.

Many years later, Carmina and Gabriel grew up as adults. Don Joaquin and Yaya Adora were very happy that they are very close together. Suddenly, the family would become devastated when Don Joaquin died in front of his children and house helper. After the funeral, Milo returns from Manila and became the owner of the estate. Since he has a long-time grudge towards Gabriel, he starts to treat him as a servant instead of being expelled out of the estate, much to Carmina's disappointment.

During a welcome party for Alan and Sandra Ilustre, Gabriel was beaten up by Milo and his men. Because of his, Gabriel became jealous of Alan and his relationship with Carmina began to sour. Alan proposed to Carmina, but she refused. When Gabriel heard a conversation of Carmina and Yaya Adora, he decided to ran away. Milo then turned his estate into a casino, making Carmina disappointed. She went to Alan and accepted his marriage proposal. Both are blessed with a happy marriage.

Three years after, Gabriel has returned and challenged Milo in a gambling game. If Gabriel wins, he get all of Milo's estate, but if Milo wins, he will have Gabriel's new automobile and PHP 100,000 cash. Gabriel and Carmina reunited and told them that he came from a rich family and was kidnapped when he was a child and he already took Milo's estate, after Milo was defeated. Milo became a lowly servant to Gabriel, after Gabriel notarized the Deed of Transfer. Gabriel told Carmina that he still loves her. But Carmina said that he loves Alan and he can't leave him. Gabriel met Sandra and they fell in love. But, Alan disapprove their relationship because of being a houseboy and because of some gossips on how he became rich that easily. Sandra told Carmina that Gabriel proposed her for marriage. But, Carmina told Sandra that she should not marry Gabriel because he will hurt her. Sandra said to Carmina that the reason why she wanted to stop the wedding because she had feelings for Gabriel. She threatened her to get rid of Gabriel if she don't want Alan to knew about it. Carmina asked Gabriel not to drag Sandra to get his revenge on Alan. But, Gabriel said that he's not getting his revenge on Alan, but to Carmina. She also asked Alan to stop Sandra for marrying Gabriel, but Alan said that he has nothing to do with it, but Carmina said that she would die if the two would marry. Carmina and Gabriel met at the hill once again rekindling their love for each other. Carmina is willing to be with Gabriel, but she has to say goodbye to Alan. When Carmina asked Alan for their separation, he became more violent and lock her up. Gabriel who is waiting for Carmina in the hill, received a letter from her. The letter said that she can't leave Alan because he's still her husband. It found out that Alan forged a letter for Gabriel. During the wedding of Sandra and Gabriel, Carmina fainted and was found out to be pregnant. Sandra also found out that Gabriel still loves Carmina. She asked Gabriel to love her, but Gabriel never spoke. When Carmina attempts to go to Gabriel, Alan came and became more violent. He believes that the child Carmina is carrying is Gabriel's. Carmina then admits that she only married Alan because of his wealth and in the three years of their marriage, she still loves Gabriel. Alan then told Carmina that he will abort the child in her womb, but she refused. When Carmina attempts to escape, Alan tried to stop her, but Carmina fought back. Because she's locked in the house, Carmina lock herself in the bathroom. There she suffered a miscarriage because of the beating she suffered from Alan. She then took a blade and slit her wrist. Yaya Adora came to Gabriel, and Gabriel went to Carmina. He told Carmina that it was her fault that she didn't fought for their love. Yaya Adora told Gabriel that Alan might come. But Gabriel said that he will never leave, even if Alan would kill him.

As they walk to the balcony, Carmina and Gabriel began fantasizing about their happiness in the palace, similar to their childhood game, but only to realize that it would be in paradise. Gabriel tearfully promises to love again in heaven until Carmina dies in her arms. Alan came and told Gabriel to let go of his wife. Gabriel said that she was never his wife and from her first breath until her last, she was his. Gabriel's devastation continues to her grave where he suffers emotional grief and pain. However, this would cut short when Milo shoots Gabriel to death with his revolver, leaving to his death in Carmina's grave. Days have passed, and he is now buried alongside Carmina with the attendance of Alan, Sandra, and Yaya Adora. Alan stated they now rest in peace, he and Sandra, who was also devastated by Gabriel's death, will live in peace. However, for Yaya Adora, she believes that Carmina and Gabriel are not yet dead but they were just started to live. Before she leaves their graves, she hears the angelic laughter of the two and as she looks behind, she sees the souls of Carmina and Gabriel live happily in peace together in heaven. After a moment of witness, Yaya Adora smiled happily for them.

The film ends with the souls of Carmina and Gabriel running into the hills and dancing into the sunset together.

Cast of characters

Production 
In all of the film’s 26 shooting days, only five were spent in Batanes. The rest of the shooting days were shot in Villa Escudero in Tiaong, Quezon. According to Carlos Siguion-Reyna, the film's director, all of the scenes filmed in Batanes were shot in available sunlight, with the support of reflectors, and no camera dollies. In filming the most "iconic" scene, the director and Romy Vitug, the film's cinematographer, shot the scene in slow motion by shooting at high speed. The lead actors were exhausted from the running for the scene as well as the tiresome efforts of the film's staff and crew members.

Music
The film's theme song "Hanggang sa Dulo ng Walang Hanggan" was originally composed and written by George Canseco. It was performed by Richard Reynoso and arranged by Ryan Cayabyab.

Release 
Hihintayin Kita sa Langit was produced by Reyna Films and distributed by Bonanza Films. The film was theatrically released in the Philippines on June 13, 1991, which is two days before the unexpected eruption of Mount Pinatubo. Despite the volcanic eruption, the film became a box office success.

Digitally restored version 

The film was digitally restored and remastered by the ABS-CBN Film Archives in partnership with Central Digital Lab as part of their Sagip Pelikula campaign. The source element used for the film's restoration was the uncut original 35mm picture negative, which was taken from the storage of Reyna Films. The film was first scanned in 4K resolution and converted to 2K resolution for the preparation of its restoration. The image restoration took a total of 660 actual manual hours to eliminate and address its defects including unsteady shots, warps, missing frames, and bumps that originated from the splice marks of the print. For the color grading, it took 100 actual manual hours to restore the film's color and tonalities, with the assistance and supervision of the film's director and cinematographer. For restoring the film's audio, it was also supervised by the director.

It was premiered on February 27, 2017, at the Glorietta 4 Cinema in the Ayala Center, Makati, Metro Manila. The premiere was attended by the film's director Carlos Siguion-Reyna; writer Raquel Villavicencio; stars Richard Gomez, Dawn Zulueta, Eric Quizon, Guila Alvarez, and Vangie Labalan; cinematographer Romy Vitug; editor Jess Navarro; and the singer of the film's theme song, Richard Reynoso. It was also attended by Richard Gomez's wife and 4th District of Leyte representative, Lucy Torres-Gomez and the director's family consisting of his wife, actress-writer Bibeth Orteza and children, actor Rafa Siguion-Reyna and Sarah Siguion-Reyna.

Television broadcast 
The restored version of the film has received a free-to-air television premiere on ABS-CBN and its high-definition service on November 26, 2017, as a feature presentation of its Restored Classics banner for the network's Sunday late-night presentation program Sunday's Best. According to AGB Nielsen Nationwide Urban Television Audience Measurement (NUTAM) ratings, the ABS-CBN broadcast of the film attained a nationwide rating of 1.2%, losing against GMA Network's broadcast of Manny Pacquiao's monthly drama anthology program Stories for the Soul during its first hour, attaining a 2% rating but won against Diyos at Bayan, also broadcast by GMA Network, which attained a 0.7% rating during its second and last hour.

Reception

Critical reception
DJ Ramones of Reverse Delay gave a positive review of the film and described the film's story and visuals as old-fashioned but it continues to give the romantic thrills to both old and new audiences.

Indonesian film critic Bavner Donaldo rated the film 4 out of 5 stars and he praised Carlos Siguion-Reyna's direction, acting performances of the Richard-Dawn tandem, and Romy Vitug's photography. Despite he didn't like the tragic ending, the film made him enchanted and it has been his favorite Filipino romantic drama film.

Television adaptation 

The film was adapted for television by ABS-CBN in 2012. The TV series ran from January 16 through October 24, 2012, and was top-billed by Coco Martin and Julia Montes and original stars Richard Gomez and Dawn Zulueta along with an ensemble cast.

The song "Hanggang sa Dulo ng Walang Hanggan" (performed by Richard Reynoso in the film) was also used as the program's theme song.

See also 
 Wuthering Heights
 List of Wuthering Heights adaptations
 The Promise (2007 film)
 Walang Hanggan (2012 TV series)

References

External links 

1991 films
1991 romantic drama films
Philippine romantic drama films
Films based on Wuthering Heights
Films directed by Carlos Siguion-Reyna